A cigarette machine is a vending machine that dispenses packs of cigarettes in exchange for payment. Many modern cigarette machines require customers to swipe an identification card to prevent persons under the legal smoking age from purchasing tobacco. Because of their potential for misuse by underage persons, many jurisdictions restrict where cigarette machines can be located or prohibit them altogether.

Bans and restrictions 
In order to aid the restriction of sale of tobacco to minors, cigarette machines are regulated in many countries.

Japan 
Since July 2008, companies may face prosecution if found selling tobacco to anyone under the legal age, 20 years old. To avoid this, Japan has introduced a government registered electronic smart card, called Taspo, that allows the user to purchase from the machines. To get a Taspo card, the purchaser must present their passport or ID to any government-authorized business offering the service.

As an automated way of determining age, the Fujitaka company is developing a technology that allows the vending machine to determine, using a digital camera and based on the facial wrinkles and sags of the potential buyer, whether the buyer is old enough to purchase cigarettes. The system compares facial characteristics including bone structure, sags, and crow's feet against a record of more than 100,000 people. However, if the user fails they can still use the machine with a Taspo card.

Regulatory status by country

See also 
 Action on Smoking and Health
 Clark Whittington, creator of the Art-o-mat, a project to convert disused cigarette machines into art vending machines
 Distroboto, a Canadian project to convert disused cigarette machines into zine vending machines
 Taspo, a Japanese system for age verification at cigarette machines

References

External links 

 Cigarette vending machines ash.org.uk
 Bundesverband Deutscher Tabakwaren-Großhändler und Automatenaufsteller (German)
 Kunstprojekt: Alle Zigarettenautomaten in Biberach/Riß (German)

Cigarettes
Vending machines